Simone Meier (born 15 November 1965) is a Swiss middle-distance runner. She competed in the women's 1500 metres at the 1992 Summer Olympics.

References

1965 births
Living people
Athletes (track and field) at the 1992 Summer Olympics
Swiss female middle-distance runners
Olympic athletes of Switzerland
Place of birth missing (living people)